Rubus illecebrosus is a red-fruited species of Rubus that originally came from Japan (where is it called バライチゴ, roseberry), but is also very popular in some European countries like Lithuania. Common names include balloon berry and strawberry raspberry. It has become sparingly naturalized in scattered locations in Canada, the United States, and South America.

Leaves are pinnately compound.

References

External links
 
 

illecebrosus
Flora of Japan
Berries
Plants described in 1899